John Moyer (born November 30, 1973) is an American musician, best known as the bassist and backing vocalist for the heavy metal band Disturbed. Taking over in 2004 after Steve "Fuzz" Kmak was fired, Moyer has played bass guitar with the group since their third studio album, Ten Thousand Fists, which he played on as a session member, becoming a full-time member around 2005 during the supporting tour for the album. Moyer was also the bassist for the American supergroup Adrenaline Mob, joining in February 2012, and remained with the band until August 2014. He currently plays in Stereo Satellite, Art of Anarchy, and in 2015 he became a full-time member of the band Operation: Mindcrime.

Biography 
Moyer was born and raised in El Paso, Texas, and graduated from Coronado High School. Moyer was formerly part of the Texas hard rock act The Union Underground. Prior to his stint in The Union Underground, he was the bassist of the popular band Soak, also hailing from Texas. He is the owner and teaches at Natural Ear Music in Austin, Texas, where he works with a lot of young bands. Moyer works in partnership with Silver Tongue Management.

While he is still capable of playing finger-style, Moyer prefers picking because it has a more aggressive feeling.

In February 2012, it was announced that Moyer had joined the supergroup Adrenaline Mob while Disturbed was on hiatus.

In April 2013, Moyer was announced to be filling in for Rudy Sarzo on bass for five tour dates in Geoff Tate's lineup formed after his dismissal from Queensrÿche.

On May 14, 2014, Moyer was involved in a tour bus accident while on tour with Adrenaline Mob supporting Avenged Sevenfold. No serious injuries were sustained by any of the band-members.

In August 2014, Moyer announced that he would not be joining Adrenaline Mob for their upcoming fall tours. As a result, the band began looking for a new bassist, thus ending Moyer's tenure with the band.

In January 2015, Moyer originally formed the band with Scott Weiland, Ron "Bumblefoot" Thal, twins Jon and Vince Votta entitled Art of Anarchy, and released their debut self-titled album in 2015 shortly before Scott Weiland's death in December 2015.

Equipment 

Moyer had a custom line with Traben bass company. He and the company produced his signature Traben Havoc. He also has custom amps with Kustom featuring his own design printed on the front resembling a skull engulfed in flames.  More recently he signed a new deal with Hartke amps that he uses currently.

Moyer also at one point signed an endorsement deal with BC Rich Guitars, who for a while manufactured Moyer's signature Havoc bass. They can do this because they are owned by the same holding company as Traben.  However in 2014, he has been seen with some Spector bass models like Euro LX5 and signed on as an endorser soon after.  Additionally he has been seen with a few other basses over the years, most notably Music Man Stingrays.

Basses
B.C. Rich Havoc 4 and 5 string signature basses (Formerly made by Traben)
Music Man Stingray 5 string bass
Spector Euro LX5 4 and 5 string basses (currently, B.C. Rich and Music Man models very seldom used)

Amplifiers
 Various Hartke models (currently)
Kustom Groove 1300 HD bass amplifier head (previously)
Kustom John Moyer G-810H JM 8x10 bass cabinets (previously)

Discography

Soak 
Omniphonic Globalnova (1995)
Self-Titled (1997)
Flywatt (1998)
2179 (1999)

The Union Underground 
An Education in Rebellion (2000)

Disturbed 
Ten Thousand Fists (2005)
Indestructible (2008)
Asylum (2010)
The Lost Children (2011)
Evolution (2018)
Divisive (2022)

Adrenaline Mob 
Covertà (2013)
Men of Honor (2014)

Art of Anarchy 
 Art of Anarchy (2015)
 The Madness (2017)

Operation: Mindcrime 
The Key (2015)

Solo 
Scivelation – Soundtrack (2012)

Dark Sky Choir 
Reboot (2018)

Filmography 
The Making of Indestructible
Indestructible in Germany
Decade of Disturbed
Rock House Method: John Moyer – Modern Metal Bass

Awards and nominations 

Loudwire Music Awards

|-
| 2015 || John Moyer || Best Bassist ||

References

External links 

 Moyer's website
 Disturbed's official website

1973 births
Living people
American rock bass guitarists
People from El Paso, Texas
Disturbed (band) members
American heavy metal bass guitarists
American male bass guitarists
Alternative metal bass guitarists
Guitarists from Chicago
American male guitarists
Adrenaline Mob members
Art of Anarchy members
Operation: Mindcrime (band) members
21st-century American bass guitarists